Teymur Yusif oghlu Musayev (16 September 1970) is the Minister of Healthcare of the Republic of Azerbaijan.

Biography 
He was born on 16 September 1970 in Baku. He received his secondary education in the People's Democratic Republic of Algeria in 1977-1981, and then in Baku in 1981-1987. In 1987-1993 he studied at the faculty of treatment and prevention of the Azerbaijan Medical Institute. He defended his dissertation on 25 December 2000 and received the degree of PhD by the decision of the Higher Attestation Commission on 4 April 2001.

From 2003 to 2004 he was a student of the diploma course on "laparoscopic surgery" at the Louis Pasteur University, France. In 2013-2015 he studied at Riga International School of Business and Economics and Riga Stradiņš University, and in May 2015 received a master's degree in Master of Health Management (business executive).

Since April 2020, he has been the head of the Health Organization Department of the Ministry of Health. On 23 April 2021, President Ilham Aliyev signed an order appointing Teymur Yusif oglu Musayev First Deputy Minister of Health of the Republic of Azerbaijan. By another order, Teymur Yusif oglu Musayev was authorized to act as the Minister of Health of the Republic of Azerbaijan. On 19 January 2022, he was appointed Minister of Health of the Republic of Azerbaijan.

References 

1970 births
Living people
Azerbaijan Medical University alumni
Government ministers of Azerbaijan